Jana Pidrmanová (born 17 March 1985, Cheb) is a Czech theatre and film actor.

Biography
She has spent her childhood in Františkovy Lázně and graduated from a hotel high school.  After graduation she studied at Theatre Faculty of the Academy of Performing Arts (DAMU) (from 2004 to 2008), her teachers were e.g. Eva Salzmannová, Alois Švehlík, Jan Nebeský and Daria Ullrichová.  She also studied special education at the University of Hradec Králové. After graduating from DAMU, she first performed at the South Bohemian Theater (Jihočeské divadlo, České Budějovice) and since 2009 she has been performing at the National Theater in Prague.

Selected theatre roles
 2008 Hadar Galron: Mikve, Tehíla, Stavovské divadlo, dir. Michal Dočekal
 2010 David Harrower: Blackbird, Una, Divadlo Kolovrat, dir. Jiří Pokorný
 2011 William Shakespeare: Zkrocení zlé ženy, Bianco, Vdova, Národní divadlo, dir. Martin Čičvák
 2011 William Shakespeare: Král Lear, Regan, Národní divadlo, dir. Jan Nebeský
 2012 Molière: Pán z Prasečkova, Julie, Stavovské divadlo, dir. Hana Burešová
 2013 F. F. Šamberk: Jedenácté přikázání, Julie, Stavovské divadlo, dir. David Drábek
 2014 Josef Čapek, Karel Čapek: Ze života hmyzu, Inženýr moderátorka, Jeho larvička, Mravenec, Národní divadlo, dir. Daniel Špinar
 2014 William Shakespeare: Othello, benátský mouřenín, Bianco, Stavovské divadlo, dir. Daniel Špinar
 2015 Mike Bartlett: Zemětřesení v Londýně, Freya, Nová scéna, dir. Daniel Špinar
 2015 Ondřej Havelka, Martin Vačkář: V rytmu swingu buší srdce mé, Zdenka, a mnohé jiné, Národní divadlo, dir. Ondřej Havelka
 2015 Maurice Maeterlinck: Modrý pták, Světlo, Noc, Dcerka, Stavovské divadlo, dir. Štěpán Pácl
 2016 Vítězslav Nezval: Manon Lescaut, Manon, Národní divadlo, dir. Daniel Špinar
 2016 A. P. Čechov: Tři sestry, Máša, Stavovské divadlo, dir. Daniel Špinar

Selected film roles

References

Citations

External links
Jana Pidrmanová in Czech National Theater Archive 
Jana Pidrmanová on Česko-Slovenská filmová databáze (Czechoslovak film database)
Jana Pidrmanová on Filmová databáze (Film database)

1985 births
Living people
Czech stage actresses
Czech film actresses
21st-century Czech actresses
Academy of Performing Arts in Prague alumni
People from Cheb